Ömer Faruk Sorak (born 27 April 1964) is a Turkish film director. He has directed more than ten films since 2000.

Selected filmography

References

External links 

1964 births
Living people
Turkish male film actors